Street & Smith or Street & Smith Publications, Inc. was a New York City publisher specializing in inexpensive paperbacks and magazines referred to as dime novels and pulp fiction.  They also published comic books and sporting yearbooks. Among their many titles was the science fiction pulp magazine Astounding Stories, acquired from Clayton Magazines in 1933, and retained until 1961. Street & Smith was founded in 1855, and was bought out in 1959. The Street & Smith headquarters was at 79 Seventh Avenue in Manhattan; it was designed by Henry F. Kilburn.

History

Founding
Francis Scott Street and Francis Shubael Smith began their publishing partnership in 1855 when they took over a broken-down fiction magazine. They then bought the existing New York Weekly Dispatch in 1858. Francis Smith was the company president from 1855 until his 1887 retirement; his son Ormond Gerald Smith taking over his role. Francis Street died in 1883. Francis Smith died on February 1, 1887. The company, which owned a six-story building at 79 Seventh Avenue (just above 14th Street), became a publisher of inexpensive novels and weekly magazines starting in the 1880s and continuing into 1959. In the early decades of the 20th century, Ormond V. Gould was the company secretary. Ormond Smith remained company president until his death in 1933.

In 1933, Street & Smith bought titles from Clayton Magazines, including Astounding Stories. In 1934 they put out 35 different magazines, looked after by about a dozen editors, including John Nanovic, Frank Blackwell, Daisy Bacon and F. Orlin Tremaine. The company paid one cent a word, which was standard base rate among the major publishing groups, though fringe publishers paid less. In 1937, Street & Smith discontinued a number of their pulp titles, including Top-Notch and Complete Stories, the start of a long-term shrinking of their pulp line. In 1938, Allen L. Grammer became president. He had spent more than twenty years as an ergonomics expert for Curtis Publishing Company, and made a small fortune inventing a new printing process. He moved the offices into a skyscraper.

Street & Smith published comic books from 1940 to 1949, their most notable titles being The Shadow, from their pulp magazine line, Super-Magician Comics, Supersnipe Comics, True Sport Picture Stories, Bill Barnes/Air Ace and Doc Savage Comics, also from pulp magazine line.

Demise
Street & Smith stopped publishing all their pulps and comics in 1949, selling off several of their titles to Popular Publications. Sales had declined with the advent of television. Street & Smith continued to publish Astounding Science Fiction well into the late 1950s.

Condé Nast Publications, a subsidiary of the Newhouse family's Advance Publications, bought the company for more than $3.5 million in 1959. The company's name continued to be used on the sports pre-season preview magazines until 2007 when Advance division American City Business Journals acquired the Sporting News, originally The Sporting News, and merged Street & Smith's annuals into TSNs annuals. However, in 2017, American City Business Journals revived the Street & Smith name for its sports annuals.

The Street & Smith name survives as the named publisher of Sports Business Journal, a Condé Nast periodical.

Authors
Horatio Alger
Isaac Asimov
John W. Campbell
Weldon J. Cobb
William Wallace Cook
John R. Coryell
Lester Dent
Theodore Dreiser
J. Allan Dunn
Paul Ernst (American writer)
Walter B. Gibson
H. Rider Haggard
Robert A. Heinlein
L. Ron Hubbard
Carl Richard Jacobi 
Jack London
John Hovey Robinson (1820–67)
Clifford D. Simak
Upton Sinclair

Illustrators
Walter M. Baumhofer
Earle K. Bergey
Edd Cartier
Emery Clarke
Dean Cornwell
Harvey Dunn
Anton Otto Fisher
Frank Kramer
J. C. Leyendecker
Tom Lovell
Hubert Rogers
Harold Winfield Scott
Amos Sewell
Modest Stein
N.C. Wyeth

Archive
 Syracuse University has:
 Dime Novels with cover image files
 Yellow Kid image gallery
 Street & Smith editorial records
 Bowling Green State University has:
 Dime novels in PDF format and cover images
 Northern Illinois University has:
 Dime novels in PDF format readable online through Nickels and Dimes

See also
List of Street & Smith publications

Notes

References 
 The Writer: A Monthly Magazine for Literary Workers. January–December 1919. (An excellent description of Street & Smith's rejection policy.)
 The Fiction Factory; Or, From Pulp Row to Quality Street: The Story of 100 Years of Publishing at Street & Smith by Quentin James Reynolds. Random House, 1955. (Covers: Street & Smith, Nick Carter, Max Brand, Buffalo Bill, Frank Merriwell, Gerald Smith, Richard Duffy, Frederick Faust, dime novel, Horatio Alger, Henry Ralston, Ned Buntline, Ormond Smith, Beadle's, Edward Stratemeyer, detective fiction, Laura Jean Libbey, Astounding Science Fiction, Edith Evans)
 
Carl Jacobi stories for Street & Smith
 The Pulp Jungle by Frank Gruber (1967).

External links
 Street and Smith Digital Collection
 Street and Smith Corporate Records at Syracuse University

 
Defunct book publishing companies of the United States
Comic book publishing companies of the United States
Publishing companies established in 1855
Defunct comics and manga publishing companies
Defunct newspaper companies of the United States
Magazine publishing companies of the United States
Pulp magazine publishing companies of the United States
1855 establishments in New York (state)
1959 disestablishments in New York (state)